Vassilis Rotas (1889–1977) was a Greek politician, author and translator of Shakespeare's dramas from English into Greek.

Biography 
He was born in Chiliomodi on the Peloponnese in 1889 and studied literature at the University of Athens and drama at the Athens Conservatoire. Following he established the Popular Theatre of Athens in 1932 and during the 1930s, he translated some theater plays of William Shakespeare into Greek.

After the NAZI Germany occupied Greece in World War II, he joined the National Liberation Front (EAM) and established the Theater of the Mountains Following he toured the country with theater plays together with members of United Panhellenic Organization of Youth (EPON), the youth wing of the EAM. He was the author of the hymn of the EAM to a melody of the russian Katyusha. He was the Director of Culture in the Political Committee of National Liberation (PEEA), the political resistance movement against NAZI Germany. Following the end of World War II, he was again involved in the translations of the works of Shakespeare. Rotas and Voula Damianakou published the magazine Laikos Logos between 1966 and 1967. He died in 1977.

Legacy 
He was an important figure for the development of the greek language, preferring the Demotic over the Katharevousa. Demotic became the official greek language in 1976.  He is also the translator of the complete works of Shakespeare from English into Greek, often using words and terms seldom used in casual greek, both Kathaverousa and Demotic language.

Personal life 
He was the partner of Velou Damianakou, who also was a member of the greek resistance against NAZI Germany. Damianakou assisted him in several of the Shakespeares translations.

References 

1889 births
1977 deaths
Greek translators
Greek writers
Greek theatre people
Greek politicians
People from Corinth
People from Tenea